Trailokyamalla may refer to any of the following rulers:

 Trailokyamalla (Kalachuri dynasty), r. c. 1210s, in present-day India
 Trailokya Malla, r. 1560–1613, in present-day Nepal

Rulers who held the title Trailokyamalla

 Tailapa II of Kalyani Chalukya dynasty, r. c. 973–997, in present-day India
 Someshvara I of Kalyani Chalukya dynasty, r. c. 1042 – 1068, in present-day India 
 Karna (Chaulukya dynasty), r. c. 1064–1092, in present-day India